Corsair is a 1931 American pre-Code crime drama written, produced and directed by Roland West. The film is based on the 1931 novel Corsair, a Pirate in White Flannels by Walton Green and takes place in and was shot during the era of Prohibition in the United States. The film stars Chester Morris and Thelma Todd (credited as Alison Loyd).

Plot
College football hero John Hawks (Morris) lets himself be goaded by wealthy socialite Alison Corning (Loyd/Todd) into forgoing a job coaching the college team to be "a real man, and make real money" in the big city with her father, Stephen Corning (Emmett Corrigan), on Wall Street. He soon has more than he can stomach, making money by bilking the poor out of their meager savings with junk bonds. Mr. Corning tells John he doesn't have what it takes to succeed in the brutal world of share trading. John replies he will seek a new line of work where he will not go after elderly widows' savings.

John decides to go after those who deserve to lose their money: bootleggers. He gets inside information on Big John's (Fred Kohler) rum-running operation from Slim (Ned Sparks) through his gun moll, Sophie. Sophie taps out the information in Morse code with her typewriter to a confederate who informs John of alcohol shipments. Hawks is a modern pirate.

With his friend, 'Chub' (Frank McHugh), he captains the Corsair, a gunboat, which preys on bootleggers and then resells the cargo to their wealthy backers. He only forgot two things: that in the cutthroat world of junk bonds and margin calls, they don't use real knives, machine guns, and bombs, like the gangsters; and the girl hiding in the hold.

Cast
Chester Morris as John Hawks
Alison Loyd (Thelma Todd) as Alison Corning
Fred Kohler as Big John
Ned Sparks as Slim
Emmett Corrigan as Stephen Corning
William Austin as Richard Bentinck
Frank McHugh as 'Chub' Hopping
Frank Rice as Fish Face
Mayo Methot as Sophie
Gay Seabrook as Susie Grenoble
Addie McPhail as Jean Phillips

References

External links

1931 adventure films
1931 crime drama films
1931 films
American crime drama films
American black-and-white films
Films about organized crime in the United States
Films based on crime novels
United Artists films
Films about con artists
Wall Street films
Films about businesspeople
Seafaring films
Films about prohibition in the United States
Films directed by Roland West
American adventure films
1930s English-language films
1930s American films